Tomorrow's World was a 1965-2003 BBC series about science and technology.

Tomorrow's World may also refer to:

Music
 Tomorrow's World (album), a 2011 album by Erasure
 Tomorrow's World, a lounge music band that appeared on several compilations of the Él record label
 Tomorrow's World, an electronica band featuring Jean-Benoît Dunckel
 "Tomorrow's World", an all-star country song produced for Earth Day 1990, written by Pam Tillis and Kix Brooks
 "Tomorrow's World", a song by Killing Joke from their 1980 album Killing Joke
 "Tomorrow's World", a 1995 single by Ugly Kid Joe from the album Menace to Sobriety
 "Tomorrow's World", a 2020 single by Matthew Bellamy
 "Tomorrow World", a song by Squarepusher from his 1999 album Selection Sixteen

Television
 Tomorrow's World (film), a 20-minute 1943 Canadian documentary film
 Tomorrow's World (1959 TV series), an Australian educational series
 Tomorrow's World, a television program produced by the Living Church of God

See also
 TomorrowWorld, an electronic music festival
 Tomorrow, the World!, a 1944 black-and-white film 
 Tomorrowland (disambiguation)
 Future World (disambiguation)
 The World Tomorrow (disambiguation)